Rudd is a common name used for fish of the genus Scardinius.

Rudd may also refer to:

People
 Rudd (surname)
 Ruddell Rudd Weatherwax (1907-1985), American actor and animal trainer

Other
 Rudd, Iowa, United States, a city
 Rudd (Greyhawk), a character from the Greyhawk campaign setting for the Dungeons & Dragons roleplaying game
 Rudd Center for Food Policy and Obesity at Yale, a scientific and public policy organization in New Haven, Connecticut
 Rudd Concession, an 1888 mining concession that Charles Rudd secured from Lobengula, King of Matabeleland
 Rudd Field or McGuire Air Force Base in New Jersey

See also
 Rudd's Mouse, an African mouse
 Rodd